Jon Scott Dunkle, (sometimes also spelled John, born October 11, 1960) also known as the Peninsula Serial Killer, is an American serial killer who murdered three young boys in Belmont, California between 1981 and 1985. Dunkle was convicted of two of the murders in 1989 and was sentenced to death early the following year. Dunkle received an additional sentence of  life imprisonment without the possibility of parole in 1995 after pleading guilty to a 1985 murder. In addition to the three boys that were murdered, Dunkle assaulted numerous other boys and was arrested for other crimes, including burglaries and hit-and-run accidents.

See also
 List of serial killers in the United States
 Capital punishment in California
 John Joubert

References

1960 births
1981 murders in the United States
1985 murders in the United States
20th-century American criminals
American male criminals
American murderers of children
American people convicted of murder
American prisoners sentenced to death
American prisoners sentenced to life imprisonment
American serial killers
Criminals from California
Male serial killers
People convicted of murder by California
People from Los Angeles
Prisoners sentenced to death by California
Living people